Scaevola angustata is a species of flowering plant belonging to the family Goodeniaceae. It has pale blue to purple flowers and is endemic to South Australia.

Description

Taxonomy and naming
Scaevola angustata was first formally described in 1986 by Roger Charles Carolin and the description was published in Flora of South Australia. The specific epithet (angustata) means "narrowed".

Distribution and habitat
This species of scaevola grows on limestone, sand dunes and heath near the coast of south-eastern South Australia.

References

angustata
Flora of South Australia